The Chronicle is an American science fiction television series that was broadcast on the Sci-Fi Channel from July 14, 2001, to March 22, 2002.  The series is based on the News from the Edge series of novels (for example, Vampires from Vermont) by Mark Sumner, a St. Louis-based author.  The series was originally sold to NBC, which shot the pilot, but later found a home on Sci-Fi Channel. The original creative producers who brought the series to television were German Michael Torres and Trevor Taylor.

Premise
The show centers on a group of journalists at a tabloid newspaper, The Chronicle, and the contradictions that transpire when they realize that the various monsters, aliens, and mutants turn out to be real.

Cast

Main
 Chad Willett as Tucker Burns
 Rena Sofer as Grace Hall
 Reno Wilson as Wes Freewald 
 Jon Polito as Donald Stern

Recurring
 Curtis Armstrong as Sal the Pig-Boy
 Sharon Sachs as Vera
 Elaine Hendrix as Kristen Martin
 Octavia Spencer as Ruby
 April Bolds Chronicle Staff Writer

Episodes

Reference

External links
 
 

2000s American comic science fiction television series
2000s American horror television series
2001 American television series debuts
2002 American television series endings
Syfy original programming
Television series by 20th Century Fox Television